Sampo Marjomaa (born 1976) is a Finnish television personality and entertainer. He was born in Oulu, and was one of the first announcers on the television channel Nelonen.

Marjomaa is the host and writer of the show Hauskat kotivideot, which uses clips from America's Funniest Home Videos. He has also worked as a host on the Nelonen show Tosi-TV and can be seen in some movies by Findie film group Acid Cinema.

Filmography
 The Jolly Scoundrel (2007) - actor, camera
 The Animal Within (2007) - director, writer, filming (with JP Manninen)
 Elämäni statistina (1999) - filming
 Rakas Lara (1999) - lighting assistant
 Kura (1998) - directing, writing
 Steak (1998) - actor
 Fetus - directing, writing, editing

External links
 Sampo Marjomaa's homepage
 Nelonen homepage
 Acid Cinema homepage

Finnish television presenters
Living people
People from Oulu
1976 births